Alanreed is an unincorporated community and census-designated place (CDP) in Gray County, Texas, United States. It is part of the Pampa, Texas Micropolitan Statistical Area. It was first listed as a CDP in the 2020 census with a population of 23.

Description

The community was named for Messrs. Alan and Reed, partners in the contracting firm that laid out the present townsite for the Choctaw, Oklahoma and Texas Railroad in 1900. An earlier name for the place was Gouge Eye, in honor of a memorable saloon brawl.

Alanreed is accessible via Interstate 40 and FM 291. Loop 271 through the community is a former alignment of the historic U.S. Route 66.

The McLean Independent School District serves area students.

References

External links

 

Unincorporated communities in Texas
Unincorporated communities in Gray County, Texas
Pampa, Texas micropolitan area
Census-designated places in Texas